This is the discography of the South Korean idol boy group Highlight formerly known as Beast. Beast have been in the music business ever since making their live debut on KBS Music Bank with their debut track, "Bad Girl" on October 16, 2009. They have released six studio albums and thirteen extended plays and have also participated in singing OSTs of various Korean dramas.

In 2016, Beast moved labels from Cube Entertainment to Around Us Entertainment and subsequently re-branded their name to 'Highlight' in 2017.

Albums

Studio albums

Compilation albums

Extended plays

Singles

Korean singles

Japanese singles

Other charted songs

Other releases

Soundtrack appearances

Video albums

Music videos

References

External links
 BEAST Official website 
 

Discographies of South Korean artists
K-pop music group discographies
Discography